Autochthon, autochthons or autochthonous may refer to:

Nature 
 Autochthon (geology), a sediment or rock that can be found at its site of formation or deposition
 Autochthon (nature), or landrace, an indigenous animal or plant
 Autochthonous landrace, a plant or animal that is native to a particular agricultural system
 Autochthonous transmission, the spread of disease between two individuals in the same place
 Autochton (butterfly), a genus of butterflies

Society 
 Autochthon (ancient Greece), a concept or mythology of a people born from the land
 Autochthonous language, the language of an indigenous people
 Autochthonism or Indigenism, ethnic nationalism promoting the identity of an indigenous people
 Autochthones or Indigenous peoples, peoples with a set of specific rights based on their historical ties to a particular territory

Fiction 
 Autochthon (Atlantis), a character in Plato's myth of Atlantis
 Autochthons, characters in the novel The Divine Invasion by Philip K. Dick
 Autochthon, a Primordial in the Exalted role-playing game
 Autochthons, powerful angelic beings in Fall; or, Dodge in Hell

See also
 Aborigine (disambiguation)
 Autochthonous Croatian Party of Rights, a far right political party
 Autochtoon, Dutch people in the Netherlands
 Chthon (disambiguation)
 Constitutional autochthony, an assertion of political autonomy